Jennifer M. Adams is an American diplomat who is the nominee to be the next US Ambassador to Cape Verde.

Early life and education
Adams earned a Bachelor’s degree from Johns Hopkins University, a Master’s degree from Duke University, a Master of Philosophy degree from the Institute of Development Studies, University of Sussex, and a Doctorate from Cambridge University.

Career
Adams is a career member of the Senior Foreign Service with the United States Agency for International Development (USAID), holding the rank of Career Minister. She currently serves as a USAID Faculty Representative at the National War College, National Defense University in Washington D.C. Adams served as the Acting Assistant Administrator within the Global Health Bureau at USAID in Washington D.C. She was the USAID Mission Director at the U.S. Embassy in Mozambique. Adams has also worked as the Director of the Office of Donor Engagement in the Bureau for Policy, Planning, and Learning at USAID in Washington D.C. Other assignments include serving as the Development Counselor at the U.S. Embassy in Beijing, China, the USAID Mission Director at the U.S. Embassy Brasilia, Brazil, and as the Director of the Health and Education Office of the USAID Mission in Dakar, Senegal.

Ambassador Nomination for Cape Verde
On September 7, 2022, President Joe Biden nominated Adams to be the next ambassador to Cape Verde. On September 12, 2022, her nomination was sent to the Senate. Her nomination was returned to President Biden on January 3, 2023, as no action was taken on it for the rest of the year.

President Biden renominated Adams the same day. Her nomination is pending before the Senate Foreign Relations Committee.

Personal life
Adams speaks Portuguese and French.

References

Year of birth missing (living people)
21st-century American diplomats
Johns Hopkins University alumni
Duke University alumni
Alumni of the University of Cambridge
United States Foreign Service personnel
Living people
Place of birth missing (living people)
Alumni of the University of Sussex
American women diplomats
People of the United States Agency for International Development